The 1869 New York state election was held on November 2, 1869, to elect the Secretary of State, the State Comptroller, the Attorney General, the State Treasurer, the State Engineer, two Judges of the New York Court of Appeals, a Canal Commissioners and an Inspector of State Prisons, as well as all members of the New York State Assembly and the New York State Senate. Besides, the amended State Constitution was rejected with 223,935 votes for and 290,456 against it. Only the "Judicial Article" which re-organized the New York Court of Appeals was adopted by a small majority, with 247,240 for and 240,442 against it.

History
The Republican state convention met on September 24 at Syracuse, New York. George William Curtis was nominated for Secretary of State, Thomas Hillhouse was nominated for Comptroller and John C. Robinson was nominated for State Engineer. They declined to run, and Sigel, Greeley and Taylor were substituted by the State Committee.

Results
The whole Democratic state ticket was elected.

The incumbents Nelson, Allen, Champlain, Bristol and Richmond were re-elected. The incumbents Woodruff, Mason and Hayt were defeated. 

18 Democrats and 14 Republicans were elected to a two-year term (1870-1871) in the New York State Senate.

73 Democrats and 55 Republicans were elected for the session of 1870 to the New York State Assembly.

Notes

Sources
Result in The Tribune Almanac for 1870 compiled by Horace Greeley of the New York Tribune

See also
New York state elections

1869
 
New York